Joaquín Chapaprieta y Torregrosa (26 October 1871 – 15 October 1951) was a Spanish politician. He served as Prime Minister in 1935, during the Second Republic.

Biography 
Born in Torrevieja, province of Alicante, on 26 October 1871, son to a well-off family, his father being a ship operator. His grandfather on his father side was a Genoese who settled in the area in the mid 19th century (the original surname was Schiapeprietti). He finished his secondary education at the diocesan seminary of San Miguel in Orihuela. He earned a licentiate degree in Law from the Central University in Madrid in 1893, later taking PhD courses at the University of Bologna.

Introduced to politics as member of the moretista faction of the Liberal Party, he became a member of the Congress of Deputies in 1901. He became later a Senator, representing the provinces of La Coruña and Valladolid. He served as Minister of Labour from 7 December 1922 to 3 September 1923.

From 6 May 1935 he served as Minister of the Treasury, a position he continued to hold after 23 September when he was appointed President of the Council of Ministers, serving as an independent with support from the Spanish Confederation of the Autonomous Right (CEDA) and the Peasant's Party. His government collapsed after the CEDA vetoed a proposed increase in death duties from 1% to 3.5%. After stepping down on 14 December, he continued to serve as Minister of the Treasury until 30 December, when he resigned. He retired then from politics and focused on his law firm.

He died in Madrid on 15 October 1951.

References
Citations

Bibliography
  
 

1871 births
1951 deaths
People from Vega Baja del Segura
Liberal Party (Spain, 1880) politicians
Prime Ministers of Spain
Economy and finance ministers of Spain
Government ministers during the Second Spanish Republic
Members of the Congress of Deputies of the Spanish Restoration
Members of the Congress of Deputies of the Second Spanish Republic
Politicians from the Valencian Community
Spanish people of Italian descent